The 2008 Moratuwa bus bombing was a Claymore bomb (roadside bomb) explosion against a commuter bus carried out on June 6, 2008, in Katubbeda, Moratuwa, Sri Lanka, a suburb of Colombo very close to the University of Moratuwa. The bombing killed 23 civilians and injured around 80.

The Sri Lankan government and Amnesty International blamed the LTTE for the attack. The British foreign ministry and leading human rights organisations had condemned attacks on civilians in Sri Lanka.

See also 
 2008 Sri Lanka bus bombings

References 

2008 crimes in Sri Lanka
Attacks on civilians attributed to the Liberation Tigers of Tamil Eelam
Massacres in Sri Lanka
Liberation Tigers of Tamil Eelam attacks against buses
Liberation Tigers of Tamil Eelam attacks in Eelam War IV
Mass murder in 2008
Terrorist incidents in Sri Lanka in 2008